The list of the museums in Tbilisi, capital and the largest city of Georgia.

Main
 Georgian National Museum. Simon Janashia Museum of Georgia
 Georgian National Museum. Shalva Amiranashvili Museum of Fine Arts
 Georgian National Museum. Ioseb Grishashvili Tbilisi History Museum (Caravanserai)
 Georgian National Museum. Open Air Museum of Ethnography, Tbilisi
 Georgian National Museum. Museum of Soviet Occupation
 Georgian National Museum. Elene Akhvlediani House Museum 
 Georgian National Museum. Mose Toidze House Museum 
 Georgian National Museum. Iakob Nikoladze House Museum 
 Georgian National Museum. Ucha Japaridze House Museum
 Georgian National Museum. Institute of Palaeobiology
 Giorgi Leonidze State Museum of Georgian Literature

Branches
 Titsian Tabidze House Museum
 Nodar Dumbadze House Museum 
 Georgian State Museum of Theatre, Music, Cinema and Choreography
 Georgian State Museum of Folk and Applied Art
 Georgian National Gallery
 Tbilisi Archaeological Museum 
 State Museum of Georgian Folk Songs and Musical Instruments
 State Silk Museum 
 Money Museum 
 David Baazov Georgian Jew History Museum 
 "Animal World" – Nature Museum
 Cinema History Museum 
 Puppet Museum 
 Museum of Georgian Medicine 
 Museum of Tbilisi National Opera and Ballet Theatre
 Museum of Rustaveli Theatre
 Museum of Marjanishvili Theatre
 Museum of Tbilisi State Academy of Fine Arts
 Tapestry Museum of Tbilisi State Academy of Fine Arts
 Tbilisi Classic Gymnasium History Museum 
 Museum of Sports 
 "Tbilisi Pharmacy#1" Museum
 Museum of Aeronautics and Aviation
 Museum of Railway History
 Ilia Chavchavadze Literature-Memorial Museum
 Niko Pirosmanashvili Museum (Branch of the Niko Pirosmanashvili Museum in Mirzaani)
 Merab Kostava House Museum
 Zakaria Paliashvili House Museum
 Smirnov's House – Caucasian House
 Vakhtang Chabukiani House Museum
 Nikoloz Baratashvili House Museum
 Galaktion Tabidze House Museum
 Nikoloz Ignatov House Museum
 Otar Taktakishvili House Museum
 Natela Iankoshvili House Museum
 Veriko Anjaparidze and Mikheil Chiaureli Museum
 Soso Tsereteli House Museum
 Gedevanishvili Family Memorial Museum
 Mikheil Javakhishvili House Museum
 Ioseb Grishashvili Library-Museum
 Dendrology Museum (Tbilisi Botanical Garden)
 Animated Puppet Museum
 Museum of Tbilisi State Conservatory
 Tbilisi State University History Museum
 Georgian Émigré Museum at Tbilisi State University
 Museum of History of Georgian Geophysical Sciences
 Museum of Minerals
 Museum of Communications
 Georgian Olympic Museum
 Georgian Museum of Photography
 Revaz Lagidze Museum
 Ushangi Chkheidze House Museum
 Akaki Vasadze House Museum
 "Avlabar Illegal Typography" Museum
 Mirza Fatali Akhundov Museum of Georgian-Azerbaijani Cultural Relations
 Georgian National Center of Manuscripts

See also
List of museums in Georgia
Museum of Selfies Georgia
Museum of Illusion

References

Museums in Tbilisi. Ministry of Culture, Monuments Protection and Sport. Retrieved on December 15, 2007.

Museums
Tbilisi